Phantom settlements, or paper towns, are settlements that appear on maps but do not actually exist. They are either accidents or copyright traps. Notable examples include Argleton, Lancashire, UK and Beatosu and Goblu, US.

Agloe, New York, was invented on a 1930s map as a copyright trap. In 1950, a general store was built there and named Agloe General Store, as that was the name seen on the map. Thus, the phantom settlement became a real one.

There are also misnamed settlements, such as the villages of Mawdesky and Dummy 1325 in Lancashire on Google Maps.

There is a humorous conspiracy theory that the German city of Bielefeld is a phantom settlement, despite the fact that it has a population of over 300,000.

Paper towns can also be abandoned settlement construction sites that are no longer being built because of the owner's shortage of money.

Phantom settlements often result from copyright traps, also known as mountweazels, which is when a false entry is placed in literature to catch illegal copiers.

See also
 Paper Towns, a novel where phantom settlements become plot points
 The 2015 film of the same name, based on the novel
 Paper township
 Phantom island
 Fictitious entry

References 

Cartography
Fictitious entries
Fictional populated places